Stomatolina rufescens, common name the northern wide-mouthed shell, is a species of small sea snail, a marine gastropod mollusk in the family Trochidae, the top snails.

Description
The brown, suborbicular shell is rather depressed. The conical spire is rather acute. The whorls enlarge rapidly. They are rather convex, concentrically striated with rather unequal acute spiral ridges. In the upper whorls two or three of the ridges are larger and higher than the rest. The last whorl shows closer, less raised ridges in front. The aperture is oblong, two-thirds the diameter of the shell in width. The inner lip is arched and has a crenulate edge. The axis of the shell is imperforated. The throat is silvery pearly, with a pale reddish edge.

Distribution
This marine species is endemic to Australia and occurs off the Northern Territory and Queensland.

References

 Gray, J.E. 1847. Description of some new marine shells. Appendix 10. pp. 355–362 in Jukes, J.B. (ed). Narrative of the surveying voyage of H.M.S. Fly, commanded by Captain F.P. Blackwood, R.N. in Torres Strait, New Guinea, and other Islands of the Eastern Archipelago, during the years 1842–1846: together with an excursion into the interior of the eastern part of Java. London : T. & W. Boone Vol. 2
 Iredale,T. 1937. Middleton and Elizabeth Reef, South Pacific Ocean. The Australian Zoologist 8: 232–261
 Allan, J.K. 1950. Australian Shells: with related animals living in the sea, in freshwater and on the land. Melbourne : Georgian House xix, 470 pp., 45 pls, 112 text figs.
 Rippingale, O.H. & McMichael, D.F. 1961. Queensland and Great Barrier Reef Shells. Brisbane : Jacaranda Press 210 pp.

rufescens
Gastropods of Australia
Gastropods described in 1847